Mount Jo is a  mountain in the heart of the Adirondack Mountains of New York. It is in North Elba, New York on land owned by the Adirondack Mountain Club. The Adirondack Loj and Heart Lake are at the foot of Mount Jo. There are two trails that lead to its summit.

A steep but short and relatively easy hike compared to other mountains in the area, the Mountain offers great views of the High Peaks region, including Cascade Mountain, Mount Marcy, Algonquin Peak, Mount Colden and Indian Pass. It is near Heart Lake in North Elba. The climb offers one of the best views for the effort (a 710-foot (216 m) vertical ascent from the Loj – actual trail distance is approx. 2.6 miles roundtrip), with a sweeping vista of the Great Range of the Adirondacks.  It is seven miles (11 km) south of Lake Placid.

The mountain was named in 1877 by Henry Van Hovenberg, who built the original Adirondack Loj, for his fiancée Josephine Schofield, who died shortly before they were to have been married.

References

External links
Summit Post

Mountains of Essex County, New York
Tourist attractions in Essex County, New York
Mountains of New York (state)